Eois suarezensis is a moth in the  family Geometridae. It is found on La Réunion and Madagascar.

References

Moths described in 1923
Eois
Moths of Madagascar
Moths of Réunion